The 2016–17 Southern Miss Lady Eagles basketball team represented the University of Southern Mississippi during the 2016–17 NCAA Division I women's basketball season. The Lady Eagles, led by thirteenth year head coach Joye Lee-McNelis, play their home games at Reed Green Coliseum and are members of Conference USA.

Roster

Schedule

|-
!colspan=9 style="background:#F1C500; color:#000000;"| Exhibition

|-
!colspan=9 style="background:#F1C500; color:#000000;"| Non-conference regular season

|-
!colspan=9 style="background:#F1C500; color:#000000;"| Conference USA regular season

|-
!colspan=9 style="background:#F1C500; color:#000000;"| Conference USA Women's Tournament

|-
!colspan=9 style="background:#F1C500;"| Women's National Invitation Tournament

See also
2016–17 Southern Miss Golden Eagles basketball team

References

Southern Miss Lady Eagles basketball seasons
Southern Miss
2017 Women's National Invitation Tournament participants